The Cathedral of the Blessed Virgin Mary is a Church of England cathedral in the city of Truro, Cornwall. It was built between 1880 and 1910 to a Gothic Revival design by John Loughborough Pearson on the site of the parish church of St Mary. It is one of only three cathedrals in the United Kingdom featuring three spires.

History and description

The Diocese of Truro was established in December 1876, and its first bishop, Edward White Benson, was consecrated on 25 April 1877 at St Paul's Cathedral.

Construction began in 1880 to a design by the leading Gothic Revival architect John Loughborough Pearson. Truro was the first Anglican cathedral to be built on a new site in England since Salisbury Cathedral in 1220. The final services in St Mary's were held on Sunday 3 October 1880 and the church was demolished that month, leaving only the south aisle, which was retained to serve as the parish church. From 24 October 1880 until 1887 a temporary wooden building on an adjacent site served as the cathedral. The seats were free and unappropriated, accommodated fewer than 400 people and was extremely hot in summer and cold in winter. It was in this building that Benson introduced the new evening service of Nine Lessons and Carols on Christmas Eve, 1880. 

The choir and transepts were complete by October 1887. The service of consecration took place on 3 November, performed by E. W. Benson, by then Archbishop of Canterbury. His successor as Bishop of Truro, George Wilkinson, and twenty other bishops were also present, together with civic representatives and diocesan clergy, and about 2,000 other people. The central tower was finished by 1905 and the building was completed with the opening of the two western towers in 1910. J. L. Pearson died in 1897 and his son Frank took over the project. Frank Loughborough Pearson's other works include St Matthew's, Auckland in New Zealand. 

Pearson's design combines the Early English style with certain French characteristics, chiefly spires and rose windows. Its resemblance to Lincoln Cathedral is not coincidental; Pearson had been appointed as Lincoln Cathedral's architect and the first Bishop of Truro, Edward Benson, had previously been Canon Chancellor at Lincoln. Four kinds of stone were used: Mabe granite for the exterior, and St Stephen's granite for the interior, with dressings and shafts of Bath and Polyphant stone. The spires and turret roofs are of stone, except for a copper spire over the bell tower at west end of St Mary's Aisle. The other roofs are of slate. The cathedral is vaulted throughout. Nathaniel Hitch was responsible for the decorative sculpture, including the reredos.

The original south aisle of St Mary's Church survives, incorporated into the south-east corner of the cathedral and known as St Mary's Aisle. It still functions as the city centre's parish church. Three brasses were described by Edwin Dunkin in 1882: those of Cuthbert Sydnam (1630), Thomas Hasell (1567) and George Fitzpen, rector of the parish. As the cathedral is dedicated to the Blessed Virgin Mary, it has no Lady Chapel. A Jesus Chapel and the Chapel of Unity and Peace are reserved for quiet and prayer throughout the day. There was no chapter house until 1967, when the opportunity to enlarge the building on the south-east arose. The architect of the new building was John Taylor.

Upon the foundation of Truro Cathedral, Bishop Benson was authorised to establish 24 honorary canonries. In 1878 a new act of Parliament authorised the bishop to establish residentiary canonries. In 1882 an existing canonry was transferred to Truro from Exeter whose income enabled the provision of two canonries at Truro. In 1906 the office of sub-dean was endowed, but the position of dean was still held by the bishop, at least until 1925. This remained the case until it became possible to fund the office of dean. The Victorian acts of Parliament which apply to the cathedral are as follows: the Bishopric of Truro Act, 1876; the Truro Chapter Act, 1878; and an act to amend the latter. Preaching duties in the cathedral are shared out among the bishop, residentiary canons and honorary canons.

The Royal Maundy Service was held in the cathedral in 1994 when Elizabeth II presented 134 Cornish people with the traditional Maundy money.

Restoration

In 2002 the cathedral embarked on what was hoped to be a fifteen-year project to restore the east end, the west front and the central tower and spire. Each of the projects would be undertaken as funds allowed. The east end restoration repaired stonework and damage to the iron work on the stained glass windows. From 2004, a year-long project saw the restoration of the massive west front and towers. In 2009 and 2010 work on the central tower and spire began. 

Restoration work is being carried out by W. R. Bedford; Stuart Aston, managing director, said that the problem is the Bath Stone used on the more decorative areas of the cathedral, has not stood up well to the salts and sand in the maritime climate of Cornwall. Erosion of the stonework has left much of the exposed stonework in such a damaged condition that it resembles honeycomb. Funding for the restoration of the tower and spire has been partly met by grants from English Heritage, Friends of Truro Cathedral, the Heritage Lottery Fund, the Tanner Trust, the cathedral itself and by public subscription. The "Save Our Spire" campaign has raised nearly £50,000 towards the cost.

Governance

The cathedral is governed by a three-tier structure as set out in the Cathedral Measure and Statutes. The chapter (comprising the dean, three residentiary canons and three chapter canons), the cathedral council and the college of canons.

Dean and chapter
As of 3 October 2022:
Dean — vacant since the retirement of Roger Bush, 30 September 2022
Canon chancellor — Alan Bashforth (since 2014 installation)
Canon precentor — Simon Griffiths (since 2016 installation)
Canon missioner — vacant since 2014
Diocesan canon — vacant since April 2020; Barley was canon pastor and priest-in-charge of Tresillian and Penkevil and rural dean of Powder

Organs

The Father Willis organ of 1887 is widely regarded as one of the finest instruments in the country. "It is not easy, even today, to think how the magnificence of the Willis organ in Truro Cathedral could be improved" wrote W. L. Sumner in his 1952 book The Organ. It was built in 1887 in London and arrived in Cornwall by boat. It has an almost identical specification to the organ he built a year earlier for the then parish church of St Michael, Coventry (later Coventry Cathedral). Both instruments have the standard Willis hallmarks — tierce mixtures on Great and Swell, characterful gedackts on the Choir, and a small but telling pedal division.

Apart from the addition of the electric blower in the 1920s, no major work was done until 1963, when the grandson of the original builder carried out a conservative restoration, at a cost of some £17,000. Before this time, the organ console was situated high up within the main case of the instrument, necessitating a walk of two or three minutes up a spiral staircase in the North Transept. The action was a mixture of Barker lever, pneumatic and tracker. In 1963, the organ committee decided to keep the original tonal scheme and voicing, and move the console over on to the south side in a new gallery placed above the choir stalls to a design by the architect John Phillips. Here the organist can hear the instrument properly, and maintain close contact with the choir.

The other main organ in the cathedral is a two-manual instrument in St Mary's aisle, the sole remnant of the former parish church. It was originally built by Renatus Harris and was installed in Truro in 1750 by John Byfield. It was re-installed in the temporary church in 1880, but was significantly rebuilt and reduced in size in 1887 for installation in its current location. There is also a four-stop continuo organ by Kenneth Tickell.

In 2012, Tim Rice backed the 125-year anniversary appeal to support Truro Cathedral's choir and music.

Organists

Organist and Master of the Choristers

 1877 William Mitchell
 1881 George Robertson Sinclair (later organist of Hereford Cathedral: the G. R. S. of Elgar's Enigma Variations)
 1890 Mark James Monk
 1920 Hubert Stanley Middleton (later organist of Ely Cathedral and Trinity College, Cambridge)
 1926 John Dykes Bower
 1929 Guillaume Ormond
 1971 John Charles Winter (later Organist Emeritus)
 1989 David Briggs (later organist of Gloucester Cathedral)
 1994 Andrew Nethsingha (currently director of music at St John's College, Cambridge)
 2002 Robert Sharpe (currently director of music at York Minster)
 2008 Christopher Gray
 2023 James Anderson-Besant

Assistant Organists

Ivor Atkins 1885–1886
Frederick Rowland Tims 1902–1907
William Stanley Sutton 1907–1911
Mr Hall 1911
Donald Behenna
Gerald Hocken Knight 1922–1926
Arthur William Baines
John Charles Winter 1950 – 1971 (later Organist and Organist Emeritus)
Henry Doughty 1971–1991
Simon Morley 1991–2000
Christopher Gray 2000–2008
Luke Bond 2008–2017 (currently assistant director of music of St George's Chapel, Windsor Castle)
Joseph Wicks 2017–2019
Andrew Wyatt 2019-

Organ Scholars

Luke Bond 1998–1999 (later Assistant Organist 2008–2017)
Christopher Teel 1999–2000
Andrew Senn 2000–2001
Nicholas Wearne 2001–2002 (later Assistant Organist at St Mary's Cathedral, Edinburgh)
Michael Phillips 2002 (later director of music and organist at St Luke's Episcopal Church, Dallas, currently Organist at Redeemer Presbyterian Church, Austin, U.S.A.)
Tom Wilkinson 2003–2004 (currently Organist at University of St Andrews)
Claire Cousens 2004–2005
Tom Little 2005–2006
David Moore 2006–2007 (later assistant director of music at Hampstead Parish Church, London)
Shiloh Roby 2007–2008 (later organ scholar of St Patrick's Cathedral, Dublin)
Joshua Hales 2008–2009 (later organ scholar at Exeter College, Oxford)
Donald Hunt 2009–2010 (currently assistant organist at St Mary's Cathedral, Edinburgh)
Sachin Gunga 2010–2011 (later assistant organist at Llandaff Cathedral)
Edward Symington 2011–2012 (afterwards organ scholar at Westminster Cathedral)
Harry Meehan 2012–2013 (afterwards organ scholar at The Queen's College, Oxford)
Rachel Mahon 2013–2014 (currently assistant organist at Coventry Cathedral)
James Orford 2014–2015 (currently organ scholar at St Paul's Cathedral)
Joseph O’Berry 2015–2016
Käthe Wright Kaufman 2016–2017
William Fairbairn 2017–2018
Carolyn Craig 2018–2019
Manuel Piazza 2019–2020

Bells
A ring of ten bells was cast in 1909 by John Taylor & Co of Loughborough: the tenor bell weighs 33cwt-3qr-10lb (3790lb). Four further bells, also cast by Taylor, were installed in 2011: two completing the original ring to twelve, and two smaller ones to give the option of a lighter sound. In addition there are six bells in the Green Tower, previously in St Mary's Parish Church, of which five form a chiming peal. A planned great bourdon bell for the south-west tower was never made.

Choir
Truro Cathedral has had an unbroken choral tradition dating from 11 August 1876. The present-day choir has twelve adult singers who are either lay vicars or choral scholars and they are accompanied by either eighteen boy choristers or eighteen girl choristers. 
Girls were allowed to join beginning in September 2015. After the closure of Truro Cathedral School in 1982, the cathedral no longer has a dedicated cathedral school. Instead, choristers are awarded bursaries to attend Truro School.

On 8 March 2017 (International Women's Day), the girls' choir were broadcast in the Choral Evensong series on BBC Radio 3 for the first time. The service included the first performance of two pieces; a set of canticles written by Dobrinka Tabakova and a set of responses written by Sasha Johnson-Manning.

The choir appeared on 2019's season of Britain's Got Talent.

See also

List of cathedrals in the United Kingdom
List of topics related to Cornwall
List of new ecclesiastical buildings by J. L. Pearson

Notes

References

Further reading 
 Cooper, Sydney, Canon of Truro (1925) "The Restoration of the Cornish Bishopric". In: Cornish Church Guide. Truro: Blackford; pp. 30–50
 Henderson, Charles (1925) "Truro St Mary V." In: Cornish Church Guide. Truro: Blackford; pp. 209–10

External links

 
 

20th-century Church of England church buildings
Anglican cathedrals in England
Anglo-Catholic church buildings in Cornwall
Christianity in Cornwall
Churches completed in 1910
Church of England church buildings in Cornwall
Diocese of Truro
Gothic Revival church buildings in England
Gothic Revival architecture in Cornwall
Grade I listed cathedrals
Grade I listed churches in Cornwall
J. L. Pearson buildings
Truro